Aligudarz Company Farm Town ( – Shahraḵ Sharḵet Zerāʿī Alīgūdarz) is a village and company town in Pachehlak-e Sharqi Rural District, in the Central District of Aligudarz County, Lorestan Province, Iran. At the 2006 census, its population was 394, in 75 families.

References 

Towns and villages in Aligudarz County
Company towns